Freemans Waterhole is a small town west of Lake Macquarie in New South Wales, Australia, located along State Route 82 between Cooranbong and Mulbring. It is part of the West Ward of the City of Lake Macquarie local government area. The suburb is mostly bushland; however, it contains several farms and two petrol stations.

References

External links
 History of Freemans Waterhole (Lake Macquarie City Library)

Suburbs of Lake Macquarie